Karl Foster Warnick from the Brigham Young University, Provo, UT was named Fellow of the Institute of Electrical and Electronics Engineers (IEEE) in 2013 for contributions to theoretical and numerical analysis of phased-array antennas and microwave systems.

References

Fellow Members of the IEEE
Living people
Year of birth missing (living people)
Place of birth missing (living people)
Brigham Young University faculty